The Broken Road is a 1921 British silent drama film directed by René Plaissetty and starring Harry Ham, Mary Massart and Tony Fraser. Three generations of a British family work to build a road in India. It was based on the 1907 novel The Broken Road by A.E.W. Mason.

Cast
 Harry Ham as Dick Linforth 
 Mary Massart as Violet Oliver 
 Tony Fraser as Shere Ali 
 June Putnam as Phyllis Carson 
 Robert English as Luffe 
 Cyril Percival as Sir John 
 William Crundall as Major Dawes 
 Hugh Westlake as Doctor Bodley 
 Charles Wemyss as Captain Phillips

References

External links

1921 films
Films directed by René Plaissetty
British drama films
British silent feature films
British black-and-white films
1921 drama films
1920s English-language films
1920s British films
Silent drama films